Marriage Morals is a 1923 American silent romantic drama film directed by William Nigh and starring Tom Moore, Ann Forrest and Harry T. Morey.

Cast
 Tom Moore as Young Harry Ryan
 Ann Forrest as Mary Gardner
 Russell Griffin as Harry Jr
 John Goldsworthy as J.C. Black
 Harry T. Morey as Marvin
 Edmund Breese as Harry's Father
 Florence Billings as Molly Mahoney
 Ben Hendricks Jr. as John Brink
 Shannon Day as His Wife
 Mickey Bennett as Mary's Brother
 Charles Craig as Harry's Pal
 Tom Lewis as Harry's Pal

References

Bibliography
 Munden, Kenneth White. The American Film Institute Catalog of Motion Pictures Produced in the United States, Part 1. University of California Press, 1997.

External links
 

1923 films
1923 drama films
1920s English-language films
American silent feature films
Silent American drama films
American black-and-white films
Films directed by William Nigh
1920s American films